Transaction Workflow Innovation Standards Team (Twist) is a not-for-profit industry standards group.  It does not charge anything for involvement.  The main goal of Twist is to create non-proprietary XML message standards for the financial services industry.  To this end it provides a message format validation service.

Its focus on financial transaction processing covers the aspects of:
 Payments and collections (on invoices to suppliers and from customers)
 Cash management (cash flow, position keeping across accounts and timing)
 Working capital finance (short term investment of spare cash to make gains)
 Wholesale financial market access (raising capital through stocks and bonds)

The focus of these combined standards is to create and improve straight-through processing (STP).  As any STP system of systems will invariably involve many market participants such standards are essential for success.  Twist provides a check-list for ensuring STP is implemented in accordance with its standards. The word ‘standards’ is used rather than protocols as Twist endeavours to also define business process best practices. Such practices are typically implemented in a workflow, or business process management system (BPMS).  Considerable emphasis is placed on how to handle exceptions so that as much traffic can be handled automatically with as little as possible going to manual intervention. One major standard introduced by TWIST is the Bank Services Billing Standard (BSB).

Parties involved
The leading party in Twist is the Royal Dutch Shell Group’s corporate treasury department, giving the Twist standards more of a corporate finance perspective as opposed to a banking perspective.  Participants in Twist come from across the broad supply chain of banking and its support industries.   A common role for Twist is to draw on expertise in corporate treasury and channel it to software vendors so that they can create the products required.  Geographically Twist has good traction in the United Kingdom, Singapore and the Netherlands.  It has momentum in the foreign exchange (FX) and fixed income (FI) and money markets (MM) asset classes.

Related standards
Related XML financial services standard include FIX, FpML and SWIFT XML. Where related financial services message standards exist, such as these XML standards or classic SWIFT, then Twist aims to leverage them and interoperate with them rather than compete. 
Reuters is working with Twist, as of May 2005, to tie into its FX trading service (known as the RTFX service).  Their aim is to deliver real time trade confirmations directly into corporate treasurer’s STP systems.

External links
Twist
Reuters works with Twist

Transaction processing
XML organizations